The Diocese of Beaumont is a Latin Church ecclesiastical territory. or diocese. of the Catholic Church covering nine counties in the state of Texas in the United States. It is a suffragan see in the ecclesiastical province of the metropolitan Archdiocese of Galveston-Houston.  St. Anthony Cathedral Basilica serves as the cathedral church.

History

1690 to 1966 
The first Catholic mission in Texas, then part of the Spanish Empire, was San Francisco de los Tejas. It was founded by Franciscan Father Damián Massanet in 1690 in the Weches area. The priests left the mission after three years, then established a second mission, Nuestro Padre San Francisco de los Tejas. near present day Alto in 1716.

In 1839, after the 1836 founding of the Texas Republic, Pope Gregory XVI erected the prefecture apostolic of Texas, covering its present day area.   The prefecture was elevated to a vicariate apostolic in 1846, the year that Texas became an American state. On May 4, 1847, Pope Pius IX elevated the vicariate into the Diocese of Galveston.  The Beaumont area would remain part of several Texas dioceses for the next 119 years.

1966 to 1994 
On September 29, 1966, Pope Paul VI established the Diocese of Beaumont and appointed Reverend Vincent Harris of the Diocese of Galveston as its first bishop. For the next five years, Harris worked to organize the new diocese and implement the decrees of the Second Vatican Council.During the 1960's, Harris put pressure on segregated Knights of Columbus councils in the diocese that refused to admit African-Americans.In 1971, Paul VI named Harris as coadjutor bishop of the Diocese of Austin 

To replace Harris in Beaumont, Paul VI appointed Bishop Warren Boudreaux of the Diocese of Lafayette in Louisiana in 1971.  After the end of the Vietnam War, the diocese received national recognition for its resettlement of refugees from what was then South Vietnam.  In 1974, Boudreaux began an outreach effort to people who made their living harvesting seafood and working on ships. Paul VI named Boudreaux as bishop of the Diocese of Houma-Thibodaux in 1977.

Paul VI named Bishop Bernard J. Ganter of the Diocese of Tulsa as the third bishop of Beaumont in 1977.  As bishop, Ganter established five new parishes, including the first Vietnamese-language parish in the United States. He started the permanent diaconate and ordained 36 men between 1979 and 1992. Ganter also established a Catholic Charities office, a diocesan financial board, a retreat center, and a biblical school for adults. Ganter died in 1993.

1994 to present 
Pope John Paul II in 1994 named Auxiliary Bishop Joseph Anthony Galante of the Archdiocese of San Antonio as the next bishop of Beaumont. Five years later in 1999, the same pope name Galante as coadjutor bishop of the Diocese of Dallas. In his place, John Paul II named Auxiliary bishop Curtis J. Guillory of the Diocese of Galveston-Houston.  While in Beaumont, Guillory established the St. Anthony Cathedral as a basilica, built a Catholic chapel at Lamar University and established a new Catholic Pastoral Center. He also created the Catholic Foundation of the Diocese of Beaumont and started a capital campaign for it.Guillory retired in 2020.

The current bishop of Beaumont is David Toups from the Diocese of St. Petersburg.  He was named by Pope Francis in 2020.

Sex abuse 
David Arceneaux of Nederland, Texas, sued the Diocese of Beaumont in 2010, claiming that he had been sexually abused by two diocesan priests, August Pucar and Roger Thibodeaux, when he was a minor.

In 2019, the diocese issued a list of 13 clergy, living and deceased, with credible accusations of sexual abuse of minors.

Bishops
 Vincent Madeley Harris (1966–1971), appointed Coadjutor Bishop of Austin
 Warren Louis Boudreaux (1971–1977), appointed Bishop of Houma-Thibodaux
 Bernard J. Ganter (1977–1993)
 Joseph Anthony Galante (1994–2000), appointed Coadjutor Bishop of Dallas and later Bishop of Camden
 Curtis J. Guillory, SVD (2000–2020)
 David Toups (2020–present)

Education
 Monsignor Kelly Catholic High School

 Bishop Byrne High School - Port Arthur (former school)
 The Our Mother of Mercy Catholic School (PreK-5) opened circa 1928 and closed in 2012.

Ministries
 ACTS Community
 African-American Ministry
 Continuing Education
 Apostleship of the Sea
 Criminal Justice Ministry
 Family Life Ministry
 Hispanic Ministry
 Holy Family Retreat Center
 Lifelong Catholic Formation/Education
 Permanent Diaconate
 Stewardship, Communication and Development
 Superintendent of Schools
 Tribunal
 Vocations
 Worship
 Youth Ministry
 Campus Ministry

References

External links 
Roman Catholic Diocese of Beaumont Official Site

 
Beaumont
Beaumont
Christian organizations established in 1966
Beaumont
Culture of Beaumont, Texas
1966 establishments in Texas